Nana Richard Abiona (born 2 December 1988), better known by his stage name Fuse ODG, is a British singer, songwriter and rapper. He is best known for his singles "Antenna" and "Dangerous Love", and for featuring on Major Lazer's "Light It Up (Remix)".

Early life
Born in London and raised in Ghana, Fuse returned to London for his secondary education, where he attended the Archbishop Lanfranc School, Croydon. He grew up in Mitcham, South London. The stage name "Fuse" comes from his fusion of musical styles, as he is known for his unusual combination of genres such as Afro-pop, hip-hop, R&B, funk and rock. "ODG", meanwhile, stands for 'Off Da Ground'.

Music career

2013–14: T.I.N.A.

On 2 June 2013, Fuse ODG released his debut single "Antenna", the song peaked at number 7 on the UK Singles Chart, the song also peaked at number 85 on the Irish Singles Chart. On 29 September 2013 he released the single "Azonto", the song peaked at number 30 on the UK Singles Chart. On 19 October 2013, he was awarded 'Best African Act' at the MOBO Award's 18th Anniversary. He recently won four awards at the Urban Music Awards 2013; Best Music Video, Best Single, Best Artiste and Best Collaboration. On 29 December 2013 he released the single "Million Pound Girl (Badder Than Bad)", the song peaked at number 5 on the UK Singles Chart, the song also peaked at number 65 on the Irish Singles Chart. On 18 May 2014 Fuse ODG released "Dangerous Love", featuring Sean Paul. It peaked at number 3 on the UK Singles Chart. His next single, "T.I.N.A." featuring British R&B artist Angel, was released on 19 October 2014. His debut album, T.I.N.A., an acronym for "This Is New Africa", was released on 3 November 2014 and includes all five singles, the album peaked to number 25 on the UK Albums Chart, the album also peaked to number 63 in Scotland. Fuse ODG turned down an offer to sing on the Band Aid 30 project because he objected to the way the lyrics of the song portrayed the victims of the ongoing Ebola virus epidemic in West Africa, and Africa generally.

2015–present
In April 2015 he featured on Tinchy Stryder's single "Imperfection". In July 2015 he released the single "Only". He features on Angel's single "Leyla". The song was released on 17 July 2015. On 4 September 2015 he released the single "Top of My Charts".

In 2016, he collaborated with British Asian artist Zack Knight and Indian rapper Badshah. They came together and composed an African/Indian soundtrack, Bombae.

Discography

Albums

Singles

As lead artist

Awards and nominations

References

External links
fuse ODG – Island RapNaija. Retrieved 13 July 2018.

Living people
1988 births
Black British male rappers
English people of Ghanaian descent
People from Mitcham
People from Tooting
Rappers from London
3 Beat Records artists